Qaleh-ye Khvajeh is a city in Khuzestan Province, Iran.

Qaleh-ye Khvajeh or Qaleh Khvajeh may also refer to:
 Qaleh-ye Khvajeh, Fars
 Qaleh Khvajeh, Isfahan
 Qaleh Khvajeh, Tehran
 Qaleh-ye Khvajeh Rural District, in Khuzestan Province